Aeromonas molluscorum is a Gram-negative, oxidase- and catalase-positive, motile bacterium with a polar flagellum of the genus Aeromonas which was isolated from bivalve molluscs (wedge shells - Donax trunculus).

References

External links
Type strain of Aeromonas molluscorum at BacDive -  the Bacterial Diversity Metadatabase

Aeromonadales
Bacteria described in 2004